Neil Christopher McGarrell (born 12 July 1972, Georgetown, Demerara, Guyana) is a former West Indian cricketer.

International career
More specifically a slow left arm bowler, McGarrell played four Tests in 2001, taking 17 wickets. He also played 17 One Day Internationals for the West Indies, but played his last international in the 2001–02 against Sri Lanka at Kandy.

Domestic career
McGarrell also had short spells as captain of Guyana in West Indian domestic cricket when regular captains Carl Hooper and Shivnarine Chanderpaul were absent due to international duties.

United States cricket
Because he was consistently ignored for West Indies selection in cricket since 2001 McGarrell announced that he had switched to the United States national cricket team because there was more opportunities it is understood he will play in World Cricket League Division Three in 2011

References

External links
 

1972 births
Living people
Guyanese cricketers
West Indies One Day International cricketers
West Indies Test cricketers
American cricketers
Guyanese emigrants to the United States
Guyana cricketers
American cricket captains